Eugène-Richard Gasana is a Rwandan diplomat and former Permanent Representative of Rwanda to the United Nations in New York City. Previously, Gasana has been the Ambassador Extraordinary and Plenipotentiary of the Republic of Rwanda to the Federal Republic of Germany, with concurrent accreditation to Austria, Bulgaria, Russia, Hungary, Poland, the Czech Republic, and Romania. Gasana was the President of the United Nations Security Council in April 2013 and July 2014.

References

External links

Rwandan diplomats
Year of birth missing (living people)
Living people
Ambassadors of Rwanda to Russia
Ambassadors of Rwanda to Germany
Ambassadors of Rwanda to Austria
Ambassadors of Rwanda to Bulgaria
Ambassadors of Rwanda to Hungary
Ambassadors of Rwanda to Poland
Ambassadors of Rwanda to the Czech Republic
Ambassadors of Rwanda to Romania
Permanent Representatives of Rwanda to the United Nations